"Safe from Harm" is the third single and opening track from Blue Lines, the 1991 debut album from British trip hop collective Massive Attack, with vocals by Shara Nelson and Robert Del Naja. The bass, guitar, and drums are sampled from the song "Stratus" by Billy Cobham, from his album Spectrum (with guitar by Tommy Bolin). Additional drums are sampled from "Good Old Music" by Funkadelic. Other samples come from Herbie Hancock's "Chameleon", and some of the background vocals are based on Johnny "Guitar" Watson's 1961 song Looking Back.

"Safe from Harm" (Perfecto Mix) is featured at the end of the Michael Mann-directed movie The Insider.

Inspiration
The liner notes to Blue Lines mention the movie Taxi Driver as an influence.

Critical reception
Pan-European magazine Music & Media wrote, "With the atmospheric synthesizer sounds, the hefty bassline and the irresistible vocals by Shara Nelson, this follow-up to the European hit Unfinished Sympathy, is likely to be as big." Mark Frith from Smash Hits commented, "Like the London Funki Dreds, the music of Bristol's Massive has a pounding bass line and reggae overtones, but Massive's records are also highly reminiscent of American soul music. "Safe From Harm" "works best as part of an LP, but still sounds good as a single."

Track listing
 "Safe from Harm" (radio edit) – 4:28
 "Safe from Harm" (12-inch version) – 6:57
 "Safe from Harm" (7-inch version) – 4:28
 "Safe from Harm" (Perfecto mix) – 8:09
 "Safe from Harm" (Just a Dub) (by Steve Smith) – 3:14
 "Safe from Harm" (Just a Groove Dub) (by Steve Smith) – 3:18

Charts

References

External links
 

Massive Attack songs
1991 singles
1991 songs
Black-and-white music videos
Song recordings produced by Jonny Dollar
Songs written by Andrew Vowles
Songs written by Daddy G
Songs written by Robert Del Naja
Songs written by Shara Nelson
Virgin Records singles